Petelotiella is a monotypic genus of flowering plants belonging to the family Urticaceae. It contains just one species, Petelotiella tonkinensis. 

It is native to Vietnam.

The genus name of Petelotiella is in honour of Paul Alfred Pételot (1885–1965), a French botanist and entomologist, whose primary scholarly focus was on medicinal plants in Southeast Asia. The genus has the former name of Petelotia 

The Latin specific epithet of tonkinensis means "of Tonkin (a French protectorate encompassing modern Northern Vietnam, 1883–1945 and 1945–1948).

Both the genus and the species were first described and published in H.Lecomte (ed.), Fl. Indo-Chine Vol.5 on page 873 in 1929.

References

Urticaceae
Urticaceae genera
Monotypic Rosales genera
Plants described in 1929
Flora of Vietnam